Methyl chloroformate is the methyl ester of chloroformic acid.  It is an oily colorless liquid, although aged samples appear yellow. It is also known for its pungent odor.

Preparation 
Methyl chloroformate can be synthesized using anhydrous methanol and phosgene. 

COCl2 + MeOH-> MeOC(O)Cl + HCl

Properties 
Methyl chloroformate hydrolyzes in water to form methanol, hydrochloric acid, and carbon dioxide. This decomposition happens violently in the presence of steam, causing foaming. The compound decomposes in heat, which can liberate hydrogen chloride, phosgene, chlorine, or other toxic gases.

Uses
Methyl chloroformate is used in organic synthesis for the introduction of the methoxycarbonyl functionality to a suitable nucleophile (i.e. carbomethoxylation).

Safety
Methyl chloroformate forms highly flammable vapour-air mixtures. The compound has a flash point of 10°C.  
Methyl chloroformate, if heated, releases phosgene. It produces hydrogen chloride upon contact with water. It will cause skin damage if in contact with skin.

See also
Ethyl chloroacetate
Chloroacetic acid

References

Methyl esters
Chloroformates
Reagents for organic chemistry